MV Uhuru is a Lake Victoria ferry in East Africa. She is a Kenya Railways Corporation train ferry that operated between Jinja, Mwanza, Musoma and Kisumu. Uhuru means "freedom" in Swahili.

Uhuru and her sister ship  were built in 1965 by Yarrow Shipbuilders in Scotstoun, Glasgow, Scotland, and entered service in 1966.

The two vessels were owned and operated by the East African Railways and Harbours Corporation (EARH) until 1977, when EARH was divided between Kenya, Tanzania and Uganda. Uhuru was transferred to the new Kenya Railways Corporation and Umoja was transferred to the new Tanzania Railways Corporation.

Uhuru was suspended from service in 2007.

It was later revived in late 2019

References

Ships built on the River Clyde
1965 ships
Ferries of Kenya
Train ferries